Bernard Hyland (Bernard Patrick Matthew Hyland, born 1937), known as Bernie Hyland, is an Australian botanist.

He has contributed significantly to the understanding of Australian plants, in particular numerous species of his home and workplace in the Wet Tropics of Queensland. His contributions include many activities; he has collected eighteen thousand specimens and has named and scientifically described hundreds of species. He has expertise in the Australian rainforests’ rich diversity of species of the plant families Lauraceae and Myrtaceae. For example, his Lauraceae 1989 major revision of seven genera of one hundred and fifteen species, and his rainforest Myrtaceae 1983 major revision of seventy species of the genus Syzygium and allied genera.

A major project he worked on for approximately 45 years is the Australian Tropical Rainforest Plants identification key and information system (RFK).

He retired in 2002, continuing as a CSIRO Honorary Research Fellow and contributing to the continuing development of RFK.

Australian Tropical Rainforest Plants information system

The most recent release is the 2020 8th edition, titled Australian Tropical Rainforest Plants Edition 8. This edition achieved the goal of making it freely available via the internet or via paid-for mobile apps for Android and iPhone. Both versions include fact sheets providing comprehensive descriptions for 2762 species, uses over 730 diagnostic features to make identifications, and contains around 14,000 images.

Legacy
The genus Hylandia, described in 1974 by Herbert K. Airy Shaw, and the following species have names in his honour: 

 Alpinia hylandii
 Antidesma hylandii
 Ardisia hylandii
 Ceratopetalum hylandii
 Cleistanthus hylandii
 Corymbia hylandii
 Diploglottis bernieana
 Euodia hylandii
 Glochidion hylandii
 Memecylon hylandii
 Premna hylandiana
 Pseuduvaria hylandii
 Rhodamnia hylandii
 Symplocos hylandii
 Wilkiea hylandii

See also
Taxa named by Bernard Hyland

References 

20th-century Australian botanists
Botanists active in Australia
Botanists with author abbreviations
1937 births
Living people